Giacomo Badoaro (1602–1654) was a Venetian nobleman and amateur poet. He is most famous for writing the libretto for Claudio Monteverdi's opera Il ritorno d'Ulisse in patria (1640). He also provided librettos for the operas Ulisse errante by Francesco Sacrati (1644) and Elena rapita da Teseo (1653) by Jacopo Melani. He was a member of the Venetian intellectual circle, the Accademia degli Incogniti.

Notes

References
Mark Ringer Opera's First Master: The Musical Dramas of Claudio Monteverdi (Amadeus Press, 2006) p. 137ff.
 Paolo Fabbri Monteverdi, translated by Tim Carter (Cambridge University Press, 1994) p. 251

External links 
 

Italian opera librettists
1602 births
1654 deaths
Giacomo
Italian male dramatists and playwrights
17th-century Venetian writers
Baroque writers